Eckerö Line is a Finnish shipping company owned by the Åland-based Rederiaktiebolaget Eckerö.  Eckerö Line operates one ferry between Helsinki (Finland) and Tallinn (Estonia). Eckerö Line should not be confused with the similarly named Eckerö Linjen, also owned by Rederiaktiebolaget Eckerö, which operates ferry services between Berghamn in the Åland Islands and Grisslehamn in Sweden.

History 
In 1992 Rederiaktiebolaget Eckerö and Birka Line founded a jointly-owned subsidiary Eestin Linjat to operate MS Alandia on the fast-growing route between Helsinki and Tallinn. The name of the company was reportedly selected for practical reasons as it required the change of only a few letters to re-paint Eckerölinjen into Eestin Linjat (or vice versa). Similarly the livery of Eestin Linjat was very similar to that of Eckerö Linjen. However, due to the use of the word Eesti (Estonian for "Estonia") instead of the Finnish word Viro, the Finnish public presumed the new company was an Estonian one. This was made worse after the Estonia-disaster in 1994 when many people in Finland began associating Eestin Linjat with EstLine, owners of the ill-fated MS Estonia. As a result of this Eestin Linjat changed its name into Eckerö Line in 1995 (with the livery of the ships made identical to those of Eckerö Linjen). At the same time a second ship, MS Apollo (a sister ship the Alandia and Eckerö Linjen's Roslagen) was added to the route.

In 1998 Eckerö Line acquired its first (and only) genuine cruiseferry, MS Nordlandia which replaced both of the previous ships sailing on the route. The Nordlandia also brought with it a slight change in livery as the typeface used in the ship's hull was changed from a heavy serif into a light, italicized sans-serif. In May 2004 Eckerö Line purchased the freight/passenger ferry MS Translandia as a second ship for the Helsinki–Tallinn route in response to the high demand for freight capacity after Estonia joined the European Union.

In May 2019 it was confirmed that P&O had sold European Endeavour to Eckerö Line. She was renamed MS Finbo Cargo and is to act as a complement to Eckerö's current vessel the Finlandia on the Helsinki to Tallinn Route commencing in June berthing at Vuosaari on the outskirts of Helsinki. She will join the service following another dry docking with an increased capacity of 366 passengers.

Fleet

Current fleet

Former ships 
Ships that are still in use are marked in green.

See also 
 Eckerö
 Viking Line (rival operator)
 Tallink (rival operator)
 Transport on the Åland Islands
 St. Peter Line (new operator from Russia)

References

External links 

 Eckerö Line official website
 Eckerö Linjen official website

Ferry companies of Finland
Transport companies established in 1995
Companies based in Helsinki